Soveyreh (also romanized as Seveyreh, Suvaireh, Soueyreh, Sovayre, and Sovīreh; also known as Sūrīn) is a village in Soviren Rural District, Cham Khalaf-e Isa District, Hendijan County, Khuzestan Province, Iran. As of the 2006 census, it had a population of 818, in 139 families.

References

Populated places in Hendijan County